A partial solar eclipse will occur on Saturday, March 29, 2025. A solar eclipse occurs when the Moon passes between Earth and the Sun, thereby totally or partly obscuring the image of the Sun for a viewer on Earth. A partial solar eclipse occurs in the polar regions of the Earth when the center of the Moon's shadow misses the Earth.

Images 
Animated path

Related eclipses

Eclipses of 2025 
 A total lunar eclipse on March 14.
 A partial solar eclipse on March 29.
 A total lunar eclipse on September 7.
 A partial solar eclipse on September 21.

Solar eclipses of 2022–2025

Saros 149

Tritos series

Metonic series

References

External links 

2025 3 29
2025 in science
March 2025 events
2025 3 29
2025 3 29